Irpicodon is a genus of fungi in the family Amylocorticiaceae. The genus is monotypic, containing the single species Irpicodon pendulus, found in Europe.

References

External links
 

Amylocorticiales
Monotypic Basidiomycota genera
Taxa described in 1966